Charles Simard-Hudon (born June 23, 1994) is a Canadian professional ice hockey Winger currently playing with the  Colorado Avalanche of the National Hockey League (NHL). He was drafted 122nd overall by the Montreal Canadiens in the 2012 NHL Entry Draft.

Playing career
Hudon played his amateur midget hockey within his native Quebec with the Saint-Eustache Vikings of the QMAAA. He was drafted to the Quebec Major Junior Hockey League, 6th overall by the Chicoutimi Saguenéens. Following two prolific seasons in the QMJHL he was selected in the 2012 NHL Entry Draft by the Montreal Canadiens.

On May 5, 2013, Hudon was signed to a three-year entry-level contract with the Montreal Canadiens. During his last junior season in 2013–14, continuing as the Saguenéens captain, Hudon lead the offense with 41 points in 33 games before he was traded to Baie-Comeau Drakkar. He helped Drakkar to the President Cup Finals, co-leading the team in goals with 10 and finishing third amongst points with 21.

In his first full professional season in 2014–15, Hudon was assigned to the Canadiens AHL affiliate, the Hamilton Bulldogs. Hudon quickly assumed a top-line scoring role and recorded a spectacular rookie season with 57 points in 75 games. Finishing second amongst the Bulldogs in scoring and second amongst rookie's league-wide, Hudon was selected to the AHL All-Rookie Team. Hudon was also selected to the AHL All-Star Game, posting 3 goals and an assist to earn co-MVP honors.

In the following 2015–16 season, Hudon was initially reassigned to new AHL affiliate, the St. John's IceCaps. On December 8, 2015, he received his first NHL recall by the Montreal Canadiens. He made his NHL debut and recorded his first NHL point with an assist in a 3–2 defeat to the Detroit Red Wings on December 10, 2015. He posted another assist in his second game before he was returned to the IceCaps on December 18, 2015.

During the 2017–18 season, Hudon recorded his first two career NHL goals in an 8–3 win over the Ottawa Senators on October 30. In his first season of regular NHL action, he ultimately generated 23 primary points (10 goals and 13 primary assists) on a team that struggled for offensive consistency.

On 6 October 2018, Hudon scored his first goal of the 2018-19 season in a 5-1 victory over the Pittsburgh Penguins. Hudon snapped a nine game goal drought on 10 November 2018, scoring the first goal in a 5-4 victory over the Vegas Golden Knights. He ultimately disappointed in his second full season with the Canadiens, registering only five points (three goals and two assists) in 32 games. Hudon rejected a qualifying contract offer, priming him for restricted free agency.

On July 19, 2019, Hudon signed a one-year, $900,000 contract extension with the Canadiens. He was waived by the Canadiens before the start of the season, but cleared and was reassigned to the Laval Rocket. After scoring nine goals to start the season with the Rocket, Hudon was recalled by the Canadiens on 16 November 2019. He was sent back to Laval on 7 December 2019 and earned a spot at the 2020 AHL All-Star Classic.

On October 12, 2020, despite his restricted free agent status with the Canadiens after he was tendered a qualifying offer it was reported that Hudon would play in Switzerland during 2020–21. On October 16, 2020, Hudon agreed to a one-year contract with Lausanne HC of the NL.

As a free agent from the Canadiens after 7 seasons under contract with the organization, Hudon was signed to a one-year, two-way contract with the Tampa Bay Lightning on July 28, 2021. Following the Lightning's training camp, Hudon was assigned to join AHL affiliate, the Syracuse Crunch for the duration of the 2021–22 season. He matched his career best mark of 57 points, collecting 30 goals and 27 assists through 66 games.

Leaving the Lightning organization at the conclusion of his contract, on July 13, 2022, Hudon was signed as a free agent to a one-year, two-way contract with the Colorado Avalanche.

Career statistics

Regular season and playoffs

International

Awards and honours

References

External links

1994 births
Living people
Baie-Comeau Drakkar players
Canadian ice hockey left wingers
Chicoutimi Saguenéens (QMJHL) players
Colorado Avalanche players
Colorado Eagles players
French Quebecers
Hamilton Bulldogs (AHL) players
Ice hockey people from Quebec
Lausanne HC players
Laval Rocket players
Montreal Canadiens draft picks
Montreal Canadiens players
People from Alma, Quebec
St. John's IceCaps players
Syracuse Crunch players